The Complete Village Vanguard Recordings, 1961, a three-CD box set released in 2005, marks the first time the entire Bill Evans Trio's complete sets at the Village Vanguard on June 25, 1961 have been released in their entirety (outside of the twelve-disc set containing Evans' complete Riverside recordings). It also marks the first US release of the first take of "Gloria's Step," which is incomplete due to a power failure.

These sets, from which the classic LPs Sunday at the Village Vanguard and Waltz for Debby were drawn, were the trio's final live recordings. Bassist Scott LaFaro would die in an automobile accident on July 6.

The album was deemed by the Library of Congress to be "culturally, historically, or aesthetically important" and added to the United States National Recording Registry for the year 2009. The Penguin Guide to Jazz Recordings included the set as part of its suggested "core collection".

Track listing

Disc one

Afternoon Set 1 
 Spoken introduction
 "Gloria's Step" (Take 1, interrupted) (Scott LaFaro)
 "Alice in Wonderland" (Take 1) (Sammy Fain-Bob Hilliard) [Sb]
 "My Foolish Heart" (Victor Young-Ned Washington) [W]
 "All of You" (Take 1) (Cole Porter)
 Announcement and intermission

Afternoon Set 2 
 "My Romance" (Take 1) (Richard Rodgers-Lorenz Hart) [W]
 "Some Other Time" (Leonard Bernstein-Betty Comden-Adolph Green) [W]
 "Solar" (Miles Davis) [S]

Disc two

Evening Set 1 
 "Gloria's Step" (Take 2) [S]
 "My Man's Gone Now" (George Gershwin-Ira Gershwin-DuBose Heyward) [S]
 "All of You" (Take 2) [S]
 "Detour Ahead" (Take 1) (Lou Carter-Herb Ellis-Johnny Frigo) [Wb]

Evening Set 2 
 Discussing repertoire
 "Waltz for Debby" (Take 1) (Bill Evans-Gene Lees) [Wb]
 "Alice in Wonderland" (Take 2) [S]
 "Porgy (I Loves You, Porgy)" (George Gershwin-Ira Gershwin-DuBose Heyward) [Wb]
 "My Romance" (Take 2) [Wb]
 "Milestones" (Miles Davis) [W]

Disc Three

Evening Set 3 
 "Detour Ahead" (Take 2) [W]
 "Gloria's Step" (Take 3) [Sb]
 "Waltz for Debby" (Take 2) [W]
 "All of You" (Take 3) [Sb]
 "Jade Visions" (Take 1) (Scott LaFaro) [Sb]
 "Jade Visions" (Take 2) [S]
 ...A few final bars

Relation to original LPs 
Tracks marked with [S] were originally released on Sunday at the Village Vanguard. The original running order was:
 "Gloria's Step" (evening set 1, take 2)
 "My Man's Gone Now" (evening set 1)
 "Solar" (afternoon set 2)
 "Alice in Wonderland" (evening set 2, take 2)
 "All of You" (evening set 1, take 2)
 "Jade Visions" (evening set 3, take 2)
In addition, tracks marked with [Sb] were bonus tracks on the CD reissue.

Tracks marked with [W] were originally released on Waltz for Debby. The original running order was:
 "My Foolish Heart" (afternoon set 1)
 "Waltz for Debby" (evening set 3, take 2)
 "Detour Ahead" (evening set 3, take 2)
 "My Romance" (afternoon set 2, take 1)
 "Some Other Time" (afternoon set 2)
 "Milestones" (evening set 2)
In addition, tracks marked with [Wb] were bonus tracks on the CD reissue.

Personnel 
 Bill Evans – piano
 Scott LaFaro – bass
 Paul Motian – drums

References 

Albums produced by Orrin Keepnews
Bill Evans live albums
2005 live albums
2005 compilation albums
United States National Recording Registry recordings
Albums recorded at the Village Vanguard
United States National Recording Registry albums